Cranberry Lake is a lake on the east branch of the Oswegatchie River in the Adirondack Park in New York in the United States. It is the third largest lake in the Adirondack Park (after Lake George and the Great Sacandaga Lake). About 75 percent of the shoreline is owned by the State of New York. The  Five Ponds Wilderness Area abuts its south shore, and the Cranberry Lake Wild Forest covers much of its remaining shoreline.

Location 
Most of the lake is in the eastern end of the Town of Clifton, but a small part of the east side of the lake is in the Town of Piercefield and a small part of the west side of the lake is in the Town of Fine. The lake is entirely in the south part of Saint Lawrence County, New York.

On a north arm of the lake is the community of Cranberry Lake. On a western arm of the lake in the Town of Fine, is the community of Wanakena, the location of the SUNY-ESF Ranger School.

Several islands are within the lake, the largest being Joe Indian Island and Buck Island. The Cranberry Lake Biological Station, also part of State University of New York College of Environmental Science and Forestry (SUNY-ESF), is located on Barber Point.

Recreation and points of interest 
A peninsula jutting into the lake from the north contains Bear Mountain and state camping facilities. One end of the Bear Mountain Trail leaves from campsite loop 3. The other end, a trail head with plenty of good parking, is located much closer to the campground entrance. The lookout spot near the top provides a great view to the south and south west, mainly of Joe Indian and Buck islands.

There are several private camps on the lake's southern shore, including an island called Chair Rock Island. A large rock on Barber Point near the Biological Station bears an engraved memorial for the international fly casting champion of the late 1800s, Reuben Wood, designer of the Reub Wood fishing flies.

There is a large camp setting called Wildcliffe Lodge (formerly "Hoppies" and then "Verns") that used to have an inn, bar and restaurant. The dining room was the former single room log cabin of Philo Scott, a hermit who married a local resident, Cordelia Stevens of Big Deer Pond, in 1856 and had eight children between 1858 and 1879. Chair Rock Lodge was another popular dining and lodging establishment on the South Shore, but both are now closed.

The Indian Mountain Club was also on the South Shore. "Sports" from downstate New York enjoyed dining, lodging and outdoor pursuits such as hunting, fishing and shooting. A large garden provided fresh vegetables and remnants of this still exist on private property abutting the Five Ponds Wilderness.

Arnold's Point – a point located near Joe Indian Island
Barber Island – an island located off Barber Point
Black Duck Hole – a bay located off the Dead Creek Flow bay
Brandy Brook Flow – a bay located on the northeast part of the lake; the mouth of Brandy Brook is in this bay
Bear Mountain Flow – a bay located north of Brandy Brook Flow bay
Birch Island – an island located off Union Point
Buck Island – an island located off Coles Point, in the South Bay
Barber Point – a point located by the inlet of Sucker Brook
Dead Creek Flow – a bay located where the Dead Creek enters the lake
Elephant Rock – an island located off Arnold's Point
Eagle Island – an island located off the Bear Mountain peninsula between Union Point and Burnt Rock point
Flatiron Point – a point located at the mouth of the Oswegatchie River Inlet Flow
Joe Indian Island – an island located off the Shanty Brook Flow; The largest island on the lake; Joe's Point and Long Point are located on this island
Matilda Bay – a bay located west of Matilda Island
Matilda Island – an island located near the outlet of the lak.
Oswegatchie River Inlet Flow – a bay located where the Oswegatchie River and Skate Creek enter the lake
South Flow – a bay located south of Buck Island; the Six Mile Creek enters the lake here

Fishing 
Fish species present in the lake are smallmouth bass, northern pike, brook trout, rock bass, yellow perch, brown bullhead, sunfish and brown trout. There is a state owned hard surface ramp on Route 3 by the outlet dam. There is also a state owned car top launch at the Cranberry Lake Campground and one more at the New York State Rangers School in Wanakena, New York.

History
The lake was named for the extensive bogs that it once contained. In 1865, the state authorized the building of a dam on the east branch of the Oswegatchie that doubled the lake's surface area and killed thousands of trees, the stumps of which still remain in some areas. In 1902, the Rich Brothers Lumber Company purchased  on the southwestern shore of Cranberry Lake and constructed a lumber mill. Housing for the millworkers was built in part from lumber salvaged from the company's abandoned Pennsylvania lumber operation. There were up to 1,500 workers at the Rich Bros. mill and associated industries.

A logging railroad was constructed connecting Wanakena to the Carthage & Adirondack Railroad at Benson Mines, starting operation in 1905. The railroad allowed tourists easy access to the area. In 1913, a second railroad called the Grasse River Railroad was built by the Emporium Lumber Company, connecting Cranberry Lake to the New York Central Railroad at Childwold Station near Conifer, New York.

The Rich Bros. Lumber Co. donated  in the vicinity of Cranberry Lake to the New York State Ranger School in 1912. A businessman, Charles Lathrop Pack, donated  of what today is the Cranberry Lake Biological Station to the New York State College of Forestry in 1923. Six years later, in 1929, the International Paper Company donated  to the Ranger School. By 1940, the state had purchased most of the remaining lands of the former lumber companies.

References

External links 
  NYS DEC information about Cranberry Lake Campground   
  SUNY-ESF Cranberry Lake Biological Station 
 The Cranberry Lake 50 hiking trail information
  Fishing information 
  Fishing information

Lakes of New York (state)
State University of New York College of Environmental Science and Forestry
Protected areas of St. Lawrence County, New York
New York State College of Forestry
Adirondack Park
Lakes of St. Lawrence County, New York